Portscatho is a coastal village on the Roseland Peninsula in Cornwall, England, United Kingdom. The village adjoins Gerrans (the villages have almost merged into one but retain their identities) on the east side of the peninsula, about seven miles (11 km) south-southeast of Truro. It has an estimated population of 1,500 people.

Portscatho lies within the Cornwall Area of Outstanding Natural Beauty (AONB).

The name Portscatho comes from the Cornish language words porth, meaning 'harbour' or 'cove', and skathow, meaning 'boats'.

References

External links

Villages in Cornwall
Populated coastal places in Cornwall